Mike Fraser is a Canadian record producer, engineer, and mixer. Fraser has recorded and mixed six records for AC/DC: The Razors Edge, Ballbreaker, Stiff Upper Lip, Black Ice, Rock or Bust, and Power Up. Fraser recorded and mixed the classic AC/DC anthem "Thunderstruck".

Other notable projects include:
Franz Ferdinand (including singles "No You Girls" and "Ulysses"), Metallica,
Aerosmith (Pump and Permanent Vacation),
Zac Brown - The Dave Grohl Sessions, Joe Satriani, The Cult, Enter Shikari, Chickenfoot, Van Halen (Balance), Elvis Costello and Led Zeppelin.

Credits

 30 Odd Foot of Grunts Bastard Life or Clarity
30 Odd Foot of Grunts Other Ways of Speaking
 5am Raise the Sun
 AC/DC Power Up
 AC/DC Rock or Bust
 AC/DC Live at River Plate
 AC/DC Iron Man 2 Soundtrack
 AC/DC Black Ice
 AC/DC Plug Me In
 AC/DC Stiff Upper Lip
 AC/DC No Bull
 AC/DC Ballbreaker
 AC/DC AC/DC Live
 AC/DC The Razors Edge
 Bryan Adams So Far So Good
 Bryan Adams Reckless
 Adema, Insomniac's Dream "Immortal"
 Aerosmith Big Ones
 Aerosmith Permanent Vacation
 Aerosmith Pump
 Airbourne, No Guts, No Glory
 Airbourne, Breakin' Outta Hell
 Amen Death Before Musick
 Amen We Have Come for Your Parents
 The Answer New Horizon
 The Answer Everyday Demons
 Armchair Cynics Killing The Romance
 Art of Dying Die Trying ft.Shaun Morgan of Seether
 Art of Dying Five Days at Rock Beach
 Art of Dying Art of Dying
 Aviator Shades - TBA
 Bad Company  Live at Wembley Live DVD 5.1
 Bad English Bad English
 Bad Religion, 30 Years Live DVD
 Bif Naked, The Promise
 Biffy Clyro, Puzzle
 Blackberry Smoke The Whipporwill - 4 Songs
 Blue Man Group  Audio
 The Blood Brothers Burn Piano Island Burn
 Bloodsimple, Cruel World
 Bloodsimple A Cruel World
 Bodyslam "เรือเล็กควรออกจากฝั่ง (Reu rek kuan auk jark fung) or Boat Must Leave The Coast
 Blue Murder Nothin'But Trouble
 Blue Murder Blue Murder
 Bottlefly Bottlefly
 Brother Clyde (Billy Ray Cyrus) "Lately"
 Buckcherry The Avengers Soundtrack "Everywhere I Go"
 Buckcherry All Night Long
 Cancer Bats Searching for Zero - out 2015
 Carmen Townsend Waitin & Seein
  The Cheer Shot With Our Own Guns
 Chemia  Let Me
 Chickenfoot  Chickenfoot III
 Chickenfoot Live in Phoenix 5.1 DVD
 Chickenfoot Chickenfoot
 Chilliwack, Look In Look Out
  CITIZENS! - Reptile
  City of Thieves - Beast Reality
 Terri Clark Roots & Wings
 Tom Cochrane & Red Rider Victory Day
 Clay Cook North Star
 Colin James Rooftop & Satellites
 Corrosion of Conformity Wiseblood
 Coverdale Page David Coverdale & Jimmy Page Pride & Joy
 Crystal Pistol Crystal Pistol
 The Cult Choice of Weapon
 The Cult Rare Cult
 The Cult Ceremony
 The Cult Sonic Temple
 Dan Reed Network Heat
 Dan Reed Network Dan Reed Network
 Dave Perkins Innocence
 Die Mannequin Fino + Bleed
 Dio Strange Highways
 Disturbance We Come Out at Night
 Doc Walker I'm Gonna Make You Love Me
 The Dudes Album Blood Guts Bruises Cuts and Single "American Girls"
 Jesse Dupree Foot Fetish
 Elias Singles All We Want and Thousand Pieces
 Elvis Costello ITUNES - Live Acoustic Set
 Enter Shikari A Flash Flood Of Colour
 Faber Drive By Your Side
 Fast Romantics Kidcutter
 Fast Romantics The Fast Romantics
 Finalist Finalist
 Finger Eleven Live Radio Concert
 Franz Ferdinand Right Thoughts, Right Words Right Action
 Franz Ferdinand Tonite incl singles Ulysses and No You Girls
 Noah Francis Ft.Killing Joke "Taught to Lose"
 Get Involved! Silk Cuts
 Glassjaw Worship and Tribute
 Gob F.U.
 Goodbye Beatdown "The Grudge"
 Gorky Park Gorky Park
 Guns N' Roses Live Era 1987-1993
 Hail the Villain, Population: Declining
 Hatebreed Rise of Brutality
 Hedley - The Show Must Go On
 Hedley Famous Last Words
 Hedley Hedley
 The Higgins Wild Minds
 Hinder Extreme Behavior
 HOG Nuthin' Sacred
 Horsehead (band) Horsehead
 Incura The Greatest Con
 IllScarlett, All Day With It
 Jackie Greene Giving Up The Ghost
 Jackyl Stayin' Alive
 Jackyl Cut the Crap
 Jackyl Push Comes to Shove
 Jakalope Born4
 Paul Janz, Electricity
 Jets Overhead "Heading For Nowhere" "I Should Be Born" "Bystander"
 The Jokers The Big Rock & Roll Show
 Jonas Big Slice
 Danko Jones Rock and Roll Is Black And Blue
 Norah Jones, My Blue Heaven
 K'Naan Young Artists for Haiti Song - "Wavin' Flag"
 Kelly Rowland, Unity
 Koritni Lady Luck
 Koritni Game of Fools
 Krokus Blitz
 Lillix Songs "Dance Alone" and "Nowhere To Run"
 Led Zeppelin Box Set Mixed 2 Songs
 Leslie West Still Climbing
 Loverboy Loverboy
 Yngwie Malmsteen Unleash The Furty
 Yngwie Malmsteen Archives
 Yngwie Malmsteen Instrumental Best
 Yngwie Malmsteen Seventh Sign Archives
 Matt Mays Terminal Romance
 Marea,  En mi hambre mando yo
 Marianas Trench, 6 tracks on Masterpiece Theatre
 Marianas Trench Fix Me
 Melissa Auf der Maur Out of Our Minds 4 songs
 Metallica Garage Inc
 Metallica Reload
 Metallica Load
 Metallica Live Shit: Binge and Purge
 Kim Mitchell I Am a Wild Party
 Mötley Crüe, Supersonic and Demonic Relics
 Mötley Crüe Carnival of Sins Live DVD
 Mother Mother Eureka
 Mumiya Troll 2011
 Neurosonic Drama Queen
 Jason Newsted Heavy Metal Music
 Robert Palmer Don't Explain
 Paradise Lost In Requiem
  Pete - Pete
 Pointed Sticks, Three Lefts Make a Right
 Poison Flesh & Blood
 Poison Not a Pretty Sight
 Pound Same Old Life
 Primal Fear Seven Seals
 Prism Young & Restless
 The Power Station Living in Fear
 The Rankin Family, "Fare The Well Love" "Rise Again" "Breath Dream Pray Love"
 Robert Palmer Don't Explain
 Rush Clockwork Angels 5.1 DVD and Live CD
 Rush Show of Hands
 Rush Exit...Stage Left
 Sam Roberts Love At The End Of The World
 Joe Satriani Unstoppable Momentum
 Joe Satriani Satchurated Live In Montreal DVD
 Joe Satriani Black Swans and Wormhole Wizards Movie Mixed in 7.1
 Joe Satriani Super Colossal
 Joe Satriani Crystal Planet
 Joe Satriani Is There Love In Space?
 Joe Satriani Satriani Live in 5.1
 Joe Satriani Engines of Creation Live in San Francisco
 Satyricon Now, Diabolical
 Seals & Crofts Sudan Village
 Shades Apart  Eyewitness
 Shades Apart Shades Apart
 Shiloh Picture Imperfect
 Slipknot Iowa
 The Smithereens Live At The House Of Blues
 Snake Handshake Snake Handshake
 Social Code Rock N' Roll
 Social Code Social Code
 Something Corporate Leaving Through the Window
 Sonic Outcast Reason To Be
 Southgang Tainted Angel
 Speak No Evil Welcome To The Downside
 The Stanfields Death & Taxes
 Stars Of Boulevard You Can Take The Money
 State of Shock Rock N' Roll Romance
 State Of Shock Life Love & Lies
 Steeve Estatof Le poison Idéal
 Stone Gods Silver Spoons & Broken Bones
 Strapping Young Lad The New Black
 Syndicate
 Andy Taylor Taylor
 Team Sleep Team Sleep
 Theory Of A Deadman Acoustic Tracks
 Thunder Behind Closed Doors
 Thunder Back Street Symphony
 Thunder Only One
 Tourist The relevance of motion
 The Treasures Bring The Night Home
 The Trews Hope and Ruin and Radio Mix of Sing Your Heart Out
 Van Halen Balance
 Vex Red Start with a Strong and Persistent Desire
 Vince Neil Carved in Stone
 The Virginmarys Cast The First Stone - 6 Songs
 Versus The Nothing "Black Gloves"
 Voodoo Six First Hit For Free
 Whitesnake Children Of The Night
 Wild Throne - Blood Maker EP
 Nathan Wiley The City Destroyed Me
 Zac Brown Band - The Dave Grohl Sessions Volume 1.

Soundtracks
 Buckcherry - The Avengers - "Everywhere I Go"
 Iron Man 2 Soundtrack
 American Pie
 Private Parts
 Legally Blonde

References
 [ Credits] at AllMusic
 Credits at Mikefrasermix.com

External links
 Official website

Canadian record producers
Living people
Juno Award for Recording Engineer of the Year winners
Year of birth missing (living people)
Place of birth missing (living people)